TransAfrica (formerly TransAfrica Forum) is an advocacy organization in Washington, D.C. that seeks to influence the foreign policy of the United States concerning African and Caribbean countries and all African diaspora groups. They are a research, education, and advocacy center for activism focusing on social, economic and political conditions in Africa, the Caribbean, and Latin America and other parts of the African Diaspora. They are the largest and oldest social justice organization in the United States that focuses on the African world. They have served as a major research, educational, and organizing institution for the African and African Descendant communities and the U.S. public in general.

Mission
TransAfrica Forum is a research, education, and advocacy center dedicated to global justice for the African World.

According to TransAfrica, it envisions a world where Africans and people of African descent are self-reliant, socially and economically prosperous, and have equal access to a more just international system that strengthens independence and democracy.

TransAfrica is an educational and organizing center that encourages human interest viewpoints in the U.S. foreign policy arena and advocates for justice for the people of Africa and the African Diaspora. TransAfrica creates solidarity between Americans and communities most affected by U.S. policies throughout the world. TransAfrica supports human rights, gender equity, democracy, and sustainable economic and environmental development.

TransAfrica advocates for more just foreign policy through the engagement of African Americans and policymakers. 

By connecting people and policymakers to those most affected by U.S. foreign policy, and by encouraging Afro-descendants to be civically active, TransAfrica works to create a more just foreign policy that reflects the values of African Americans, especially respect for human rights.

History
The Black Forum on Foreign Affairs was formed in 1975, and served as the precursor to TransAfrica. TransAfrica Forum was founded on July 1, 1977, after being conceived a year earlier at a Black Leadership Conference convened by the Congressional Black Caucus in September, 1976. A committee consisting of Randall Robinson, Herschelle Challenor, and Willard Johnson are credited for formulating an organizational design and launch. Robinson became the organization's first Director. It began to launch a series of legislative campaigns, strategic media outreach and activism that increase public awareness of apartheid in South Africa and made a contribution to the global anti-apartheid solidarity movement. It is credited for its role in the anti-apartheid struggle through its activism. Through the Free South Africa Movement, they initiated a letter-writing campaigns, hunger strikes, and protest marches to protest against apartheid and to compel the U.S. government to act against apartheid.

Arthur R. Ashe Foreign Policy Library
Named after former board member Arthur Ashe, the Arthur R. Ashe Foreign Policy Library is the only library in the U.S. dedicated to sensitizing Americans about African, Caribbean, and Latin-American issues. It is an important resource for policy analysts, scholars and the public.

Advocacy and education work
TransAfrica continues to work on similar social, political, and economic justice issues throughout the African world. The current priority areas in Africa include Democratic Republic of Congo, Egypt, Somalia, South Africa, South Sudan, Sudan, South Africa and Uganda. In the Americas, this includes Cuba, Haiti, Venezuela and the United States.

Advocacy and education events
TransAfrica continues to sponsor public seminars, community awareness campaigns and training programs to sensitize the public and policy makers. This includes the Cabral/Truth Circles, film series, lecture series, book club and a writer's forum for authors to discuss their work. They co-sponsor the annual New African Film Festival in Washington, D.C.

Free South Africa Movement
TransAfrica was a founding member of the Free South Africa Movement. It is a grassroots organization that laid the foundation for the taking the anti-apartheid movement in the U.S. to mainstream politics and lobbying for change. They were at the forefront of the sensitizing U.S. policy makers, students and the public about the anti-apartheid efforts in a strategic move. On November 21, 1984, a day before Thanksgiving, Randall Robinson, Congressman Walter Fauntroy and Mary Frances Berry were arrested for a sit-in staged at the South African embassy. This brought the Anti-South African movements to the national stage. It sparked the formation of the Free South Africa Movement in the U.S. which TransAfrica was a founding member of. Within a few days, there were more sit-ins and demonstrations against South Africa were held nationally. More than 3,000 people were arrested by 1985. TransAfrica exposed the secret strategy meetings between the South African government and the Ronald Reagan administration. TransAfrica worked with the Congressional Black Caucus in formulating legislative strategy for the Comprehensive Anti-Apartheid Act of 1986. In May 2012, the organisation received the Mandela Freedom Statuette for "exceptional contribution to the struggle for the attainment for non-racial, free and democratic South Africa" from the South Africa government.

Organization and structure
TransAfrica is run by a Board of Directors, administered by staff and supported by members. The current chairman of the board is Danny Glover. Past board members have included activists Arthur Ashe, Chuck D and Harry Belafonte. The former Director is Nicole Lee. Past Directors have included Bill Fletcher Jr.

See also

 Diaspora politics in the United States
 Ethnic interest groups in the United States

References

External links
 Official site this website has expired
TransAfrica Records Archival Collection Moorland Spingarn Research Center
 The African Activist Archive Project includes a description of TransAfrica and more than 200 documents, photographs and other related material of the organization and TransAfrica Forum.

Foreign policy political advocacy groups in the United States
African-American organizations
Anti-Apartheid organisations
Organizations established in 1977
1977 establishments in Washington, D.C.
African diaspora